Anaeini is a tribe of Neotropical brush-footed butterflies. Their wing undersides usually mimic dead leaves.

Included genera (and notable species) are:
 Anaea Hübner, [1819]
 Coenophlebia
 Consul
 Fountainea (several formerly in Anaea)
 Hypna
 Memphis (formerly included in Anaea)
 Polygrapha 
 Siderone
 Zaretis Hübner, [1819]

Anaeomorpha is sometimes placed here, but more often in the Preponini.

References

External links
Pteron Images.In Japanese but with binomial names
Mariposa Mexicanas Excellent images of Mexican Anaeni

 
Charaxinae
Taxa named by Enzio Reuter
Butterfly tribes